Neotogaria flammifera is a moth in the family Drepanidae. It was described by Constant Vincent Houlbert in 1921. It is found in China (Shaanxi, Zhejiang, Hubei, Jiangxi, Hunan, Fujian, Taiwan, Yunnan) and Vietnam.

References

Moths described in 1921
Thyatirinae
Moths of Asia